Zoumana Camara (born 3 April 1979) is a French former professional footballer who played as a centre-back. He is the manager of Paris Saint-Germain U19.

After starting out at Saint-Étienne, he went on to amass Ligue 1 totals of 344 matches and six goals over 15 seasons, representing mainly in the competition Paris Saint-Germain and winning eight major titles with that club. He also had a brief spell in England with Leeds United.

Camara appeared for France at the 2001 Confederations Cup.

Club career
Camara was born in Colombes, Hauts-de-Seine to Malian parents. He made his professional debut at only 17, appearing in two Ligue 2 seasons with Saint-Étienne. In the summer of 1998 he was purchased by Inter Milan in Italy, but only managed to appear in two Coppa Italia matches with the Nerazzurri, also being loaned twice during his two-year spell: after a five-month stint with Empoli (suffering relegation from Serie A), he spent one season back in his country with Bastia, helping the Corsicans to a 10th-place finish in Ligue 1.

After one and a half seasons with Marseille – one as a starter, the other as backup – Camara joined RC Lens. He spent the 2003–04 season on loan to English club Leeds United, scoring in a 3–2 away win against Middlesbrough on 30 August 2003 but eventually being relegated from the Premier League. Two months before leaving the Whites he blasted the organisation, claiming he would not have accepted the club's offer had he known about its financial predicament.

Camara returned to Saint-Étienne in the 2004 off-season, only missing six a total of six games for Les Verts over three top-division campaigns. In 2007, he signed a four-year contract with Paris Saint-Germain, being first choice in his first three seasons.

On 12 May 2014, aged 35, Camara signed a new one-year deal with PSG. In June of the following year, after having contributed ten appearances to the conquest of four titles, scoring in a 1–1 league draw at Stade Rennais, he retired from football.

International career
Camara earned his only cap for France on 1 June 2001, at the 2001 FIFA Confederations Cup, starting in the second group stage game against Australia (0–1 loss), with the national team eventually winning the tournament.

Coaching career 
After retiring, Camara worked for Paris Saint-Germain as assistant manager. He was in this role under Laurent Blanc, Unai Emery and Thomas Tuchel successively, but left upon the arrival of Mauricio Pochettino in January 2021. He then became a youth academy sports coordinator at the club. For the 2021–22 season, PSG promised Camara a role as a youth team coach. He was eventually confirmed as under-19 head coach on 1 July 2021.

Honours
Paris Saint-Germain
Ligue 1: 2012–13, 2013–14, 2014–15
Coupe de France: 2009–10, 2014–15
Coupe de la Ligue: 2007–08, 2013–14
Trophée des Champions: 2014

France
FIFA Confederations Cup: 2001

References

External links

Inter archives

1979 births
Living people
Sportspeople from Colombes
French sportspeople of Malian descent
Footballers from Hauts-de-Seine
Black French sportspeople
French footballers
Association football defenders
Ligue 1 players
Ligue 2 players
AS Saint-Étienne players
SC Bastia players
Olympique de Marseille players
RC Lens players
Paris Saint-Germain F.C. players
Serie A players
Inter Milan players
Empoli F.C. players
Premier League players
Leeds United F.C. players
France international footballers
2001 FIFA Confederations Cup players
FIFA Confederations Cup-winning players
French expatriate footballers
Expatriate footballers in Italy
Expatriate footballers in England
French expatriate sportspeople in Italy
French expatriate sportspeople in England
Paris Saint-Germain F.C. non-playing staff